"Restroom Occupied" is a song by American rapper Yella Beezy, featuring American singer Chris Brown. It was released on July 19, 2019 as the second single from Yella Beezy's mixtape Baccend Beezy (2019).

An official music video for the song was released on November 14, 2019, and features a club scenario.

Music Video
The video was directed by Ben Griffin. On Nov. 14, 2019 it was uploaded to Yella Beezy YouTube account. As of April 2021 it has over 30 million views.

Charts

References

2019 singles
Chris Brown songs
Songs written by Chris Brown
2019 songs